The governor of Maguindanao, was the chief executive of the provincial government of Maguindanao.

List

References

Maguindanao
1973 establishments in the Philippines
2022 disestablishments in the Philippines